Margaret Mary Butler (30 April 1883 – 4 December 1947) was a New Zealand sculptor and artist and is regarded as the first New Zealand born sculptor of substance.

Early life and education
She was born in Greymouth, West Coast, New Zealand on 30 April 1883, to Edward Butler, Grey County engineer, and his wife Mary Delaney.

She attended St Mary's College, Wellington and then at Wellington Technical School

Work

Butler's works were feature at the National Centennial Exhibition of New Zealand in 1940 and the largest collection of her work is held by Te Papa Tongarewa, the Museum of New Zealand.

Death
Margaret Butler died in Wellington of cancer on 4 December 1947. Prime minister, Peter Fraser and the Catholic archbishop of Wellington, Thomas O'Shea were attendees at her funeral.

References

1883 births
1947 deaths
20th-century New Zealand sculptors
20th-century New Zealand women artists
People from Greymouth
People educated at St Mary's College, Wellington